Fala Flow is an area of upland blanket bog on the edge of the Lammermuir Hills, in Midlothian, Scotland. Located north of the village of Fala, around 15 km south east of Edinburgh, an area of 318 hectares has been designated as a Ramsar Site since 1990.

The site is a blanket upland mire with some pools, developed at a lower altitude than most blanket bogs in Midlothian. It supports an  internationally important population of pink-footed geese, with around 3% of the Greenland and Iceland populations overwintering at the site.

As well as being recognised as a wetland of international importance under the Ramsar Convention, Fala Flow has also been designated a Special Protection Area and a Site of Special Scientific Interest. The SSSI designation has been in place since 1986 and was last assessed in 2016.

References

Ramsar sites in Scotland
Sites of Special Scientific Interest in Scotland
Wetlands of Scotland